The surnames MacEachen, McEachen, MacEachin, and McEachin are Anglicised forms of the Scottish Gaelic MacEachainn, which means "son of Eachann". The Scottish Gaelic given name Eachann is composed of two elements. The first element is each, meaning "horse". The second element is donn, which has been given two different meanings. One proposed meaning is "brown"; the other is "lord".

MacEachen
 Allan MacEachen (1921–2017), a Canadian politician
 Emilio MacEachen (born 1992), a Uruguayan footballer

McEachin
Donald McEachin (1961–2022), German-born American politician
James McEachin (born 1930), American actor
Neil McEachin (1900–1957), American politician and judge

See also
 MacEachern (surname)

References

Anglicised Scottish Gaelic-language surnames